Philodryas trilineata is a species of snake of the family Colubridae.

Geographic range
The snake is found in Argentina.

References 

Colubrids
Snakes of South America
Reptiles of Argentina
Reptiles described in 1861